Clausen is a Danish patronymic surname, literally meaning child of Claus, Claus being a German form of the Greek Νικόλαος, Nikolaos, (cf. Nicholas), used in Denmark at least since the 16th century. The spelling variant Klausen has identical pronunciation (as does the often interchangeable Claussen). 
The two variants are number 34 and 85 on the top100 of surnames in Denmark. Occurrences of Clausen/Klausen as a surname outside Denmark and Schleswig-Holstein are due to immigration. Immigrants to English-speaking countries sometimes changed the spelling to Clauson.

People
 Alden W. Clausen, (1923–2013), American businessman and former President of the World Bank
 Alf Clausen (born 1941), American film and television musical composer
 Andrea Clausen (born 1959), German stage actress (Burgtheater, Vienna)
 Arne Clausen (born 1932), Argentine Methodist Pastor
 Casey Clausen (born 1981), American football player
Christopher John Clausen (born 1942), American writer
Claus Clausen (1899-1989), German film actor
 Claus Kristian Randolph Clausen (1869–1958), US Navy officer in Spanish–American War.
 Claus Lauritz Clausen (1820–1892), pioneer Lutheran minister, military chaplain and politician.
 Connie Clausen (1923–1997), US actress, author
 Curtis Paul Clausen (1893–1976), American entomologist
 Donald Holst Clausen (1923–2015), US politician
 Frits Clausen (1893–1947), the leader of the Danish Nazi Party before the Second World War
 George Clausen (1852–1944), British painter
 Henrik Nicolai Clausen (1793–1877), Danish theologian and statesman
 Henry Christian Clausen (1905–1993), American lawyer
Herluf Stenholt Clausen (1921-2002), Danish ichthyologist
 Hugh Clausen OBE (1888–1972), British naval armaments engineer
 Major General Hugh J. Clausen (1926–2009), Deputy Judge Advocate General of the United States Army
 Jens Clausen (1891–1969), a Danish-American botanist and geneticist
 Jimmy Clausen (born 1987), US football player
John Adam Clausen (1914–1996), American sociologist
John Henry Clausen (1852–1930), farmer
 Jørgen Mads Clausen (born 1948), Danish industry magnate
 Kasper Klausen (born 1982), Danish footballer
 Kristoffer Clausen, Norwegian media personality
 Lars Clausen (1935–2010), German sociologist
 Mads Clausen (1905–1966), Danish industrialist and father of Jørgen Mads Clausen
 Mads Clausen (footballer) (born 1984), Norwegian footballer
 Meredith Clausen (born 1942), American architectural historian and professor at University of Washington
 Néstor Clausen (born 1962), Argentine footballer
 Nicolai Clausen (1911–1943), German U-boat commander
 Peter Clausen (nineteenth century, dates unclear), also known as Pedro Cláudio Dinamarquez Clausen and as Peter Claussen, Danish natural history collector
 Pit Clausen (born 1962), German politician, mayor of city Bielefeld
 Raymond M. Clausen Jr. (1947–2004), United States Marine Corps, Medal of Honor recipient, Vietnam War 31 Jan 1970.  
 René Clausen (born 1953), American composer
 Rick Clausen (born 1982), American football player
 Roy Elwood Clausen (1891–1956), American botanist and geneticist
 Sally Clausen (born 1945), American educational administrator
 Thomas Clausen (mathematician) (1801–1885), Danish mathematician and astronomer
 Thomas Clausen (musician) (born 1949), Danish jazz pianist
 Thomas Clausen (Louisiana) (1939–2002), American education superintendent, brother of Sally Clausen
 Sven Clausen (Danish author, playwright, doctor of law)  (1893-1961)

Places
 Clausen, Luxembourg, a quarter in Luxembourg City
 Clausen, Germany, a town in Rhineland-Palatinate and site of a former US Army chemical weapons facility

Other
 Clausen function, a mathematical function

References

Danish-language surnames
Patronymic surnames
Surnames from given names